Pseudomonas cedrina is a Gram-negative, rod-shaped bacterium isolated from spring waters in Lebanon. Based on 16S rRNA analysis, P. cedrina has been placed in the P. fluorescens group.

References

External links
Type strain of Pseudomonas cedrina at BacDive -  the Bacterial Diversity Metadatabase

Pseudomonadales
Bacteria described in 1999